In the Latter Day Saint movement, the term Urim and Thummim refers to a descriptive category of instruments used for receiving revelation or translating languages. According to Latter Day Saint theology, the two stones found in the breastplate of Aaron in the Old Testament, the white stone referenced in the Book of Revelation in the New Testament, the two stones bound by silver bows into a set of spectacles (interpreters) that movement founder Joseph Smith said he found buried in the hill Cumorah with the golden plates, and the seer stone found while digging a well used to translate the Book of Mormon are all examples of Urim and Thummim. Latter Day Saint scripture states that the place where God resides is a Urim and Thummim, and the earth itself will one day become sanctified and a Urim and Thummim, and that all adherents who are saved in the highest heaven will receive their own Urim and Thummim.

While the term is ubiquitous and well ingrained in modern Latter Day Saint theology, it was not initially applied to the spectacles or seer stone used in translating the Book of Mormon, and "Urim and Thummim" does not appear within the Book of Mormon or early versions of the Doctrine and Covenants.  It has been argued that Joseph Smith and Oliver Cowdery adopted the term in the early 1830s as part of a larger effort to distance the church from early folk magic practices.

History
Joseph Smith said that in 1827 he was led by an angel to dig up golden plates containing a record of ancient inhabitants of the American continent, along with "spectacles", or interpreters, that the Lord had prepared to translate the record. Smith also had in his possession a brown seer stone.  He used both devices to produce the record, which is called the Book of Mormon.

The earliest source that expands the term "Urim and Thummim" outside the biblical context is a reverse association William W. Phelps made on Hosea 3:4 in July 1832, stating that the children of Israel "were even to do without the Teraphim, [Urim & Thummim, perhaps] or sacred spectacles or declarers." The first known explicit connection between the spectacles and the term "Urim and Thummim" occurred in 1832.  Prior to this, and even frequently afterwards, they were always referred to as "spectacles" or "interpreters".

By 1833, Joseph Smith and his associates began referring to the Smith's seer stone as well as the interpreters with the Biblical term "Urim and Thummim". In January 1833 W. W. Phelps wrote about a possible connection: "It [Book of Mormon] was translated by the gift and power of God, by an unlearned man, through the aid of a pair of Interpreters, or spectacles- (known, perhaps, in ancient days as Teraphim, or Urim and Thummim)". Similarly, Oliver Cowdery wrote in September 1834, "[Smith] translated, with the Urim and Thummim, or, as the Nephites would have said, 'Interpreters'".  In 1838, Smith simply stated, "I obtained [the plates], and the Urim and Thummim with them; by the means of which, I translated the plates; and thus came the Book of Mormon."

No mention of the term "Urim and Thummim" exists in the 1833 version of the Book of Commandments, or in early transcriptions of Joseph Smith's revelations.  In the 1835 edition of the Doctrine and Covenants, revelations were modified and the term was added.

Apostle Orson Pratt gave an expansive definition in 1851 stating: "The Urim and Thummim is a stone or other substance sanctified and illuminated by the Spirit of the living God, and presented to those who are blessed with the gift of seeing."  Emma Smith, Joseph Smith's wife and scribe for part of the Book of Mormon, made a clear distinction between the two in an 1870 letter, "The first that my husband translated, was translated by the use of the Urim, and Thummim [i.e. spectacles or interpreters], and that was the part that Martin Harris lost, after that he used a small stone, not exactly, black, but was rather a dark color."

By the beginning of the 20th century, members of the Church of Jesus Christ of Latter-day Saints (LDS Church) grew to see the "Urim and Thummim" as completely dissociated from seer stones, a distinction that persists today among many members of the church.  This disassociation is typified by church leader Bruce R. McConkie who wrote: "the Prophet had a seer stone which was separate and distinct from the Urim and Thummim."

Reasons for adoption of the term
The motive for adopting the term 'Urim and Thummim' is the subject of continued debate and ongoing study.  

The general consensus is that it was part of a larger effort to de-emphasize early folk magic practices, and bring them into the mainstream.  Joseph Smith was put on trial in 1826, and twice in 1830 for practicing folk magic and being a "stone gazer".  Fear of further litigation, and shifting cultural attitudes towards the acceptability of folk magic in 1830 American society, led Smith to remove allusions to folk magic elements in his early life (such as treasure seeking activities, divining rods, magic circles and seer stones)

Some apologists within the LDS Church argue that Smith never used the seer stone in the translation, that the term 'Urim and Thummim' is not a later development, and accuse those who make a distinction of being revisionist historians.

Recent publications by the LDS Church acknowledge the shift in terminology occurring in the early 1830s, but do not speculate on reasons for doing so.  Unaffiliated apologetic site FairMormon attributes the change to early Latter Day Saints noticing similarities between the biblical devices and the Nephite interpreters, the term naturally entered the vernacular over time, and that "use of the term Urim and Thummim has unfortunately obscured the fact that all such devices belong in the same class of consecrated revelatory aids and that more than one were used in the translation."

Interpreters (Spectacles)
In 1827, Smith said that he had been visited again by the angel who had previously revealed the location of the golden plates, along with other items such as the Urim and Thummim, and that these objects were buried in a nearby hillside. After Martin Harris lost 116 pages of the Book of Mormon manuscript in June 1828, Smith said that the Angel Moroni took back the plates and interpreters.  Later, the plates and interpreters were returned.  Several accounts have him translating exclusively with the seer stone from that point on.  David Whitmer was asked in 1855 the role of the Interpreters in the translation of the Book of Mormon and responded:

"[Joseph Smith] used a stone called a 'Seers stone,' the 'Interpreters' having been taken away from him because of transgression. The 'Interpreters' were taken from Joseph after he allowed Martin Harris to carry away the 116 pages of Ms of the Book of Mormon as a punishment, but he was allowed to go on and translate by the use of a 'Seers stone' which he had, and which he placed in a hat into which he buried his face, stating to me and others that the original character appeared upon parchment and under it the translation in English."

Smith said that after translating the Book of Mormon, he returned the plates and the Urim and Thummim to the angel, whom he identified as the resurrected Moroni. Smith reportedly told Orson Pratt that the Lord gave him the Urim and Thummim when he was an inexperienced translator but that as he grew in experience, he no longer needed such assistance.

What the interpreters looked like, and how they were used has been the source of debate, as there are several conflicting descriptions. These different descriptions, and Smith's silence on the mode of translation, has led to a wide range of artistic interpretations.  How the interpreters were used in the translation is also unknown.  Joseph Smith answered when asked on the particulars of translation, "It was not intended to tell the world all the particulars of the coming forth of the book of Mormon."  The majority of the descriptions of the translation with the interpreters have Smith looking through transparent, glass-like stones at the text, and it being converted into English words.  Confusing the matter, are a few accounts that have Smith putting the spectacles in a hat and reading words off the surface of the stones as they would appear, although this could be a conflation with the seer stone, which Smith did put into a hat and read from.

Beliefs
Many Latter Day Saints believe that the Urim and Thummim of Joseph Smith and the Book of Mormon were the functional equivalent of the Urim and Thummim mentioned in the Old Testament.

In the Book of Mormon, the prophets the Brother of Jared and Mosiah both used devices called "interpreters" to receive revelation for their people.  In the Doctrine and Covenants, it states that the Urim and Thummim Smith originally possessed was the same one possessed by the Jaredites. In the Book of Abraham, which Smith said he translated from Egyptian Papyri, the prophet Abraham used a Urim and Thummim given to him in the city Ur to receive a revelation from God about astronomy.

In 1841, apostles Wilford Woodruff and George A. Smith confiscated several seer stones and grimoires from convert William Mountford in Staffordshire, England. The grimoires were destroyed and seer stones were sent to Nauvoo. Joseph Smith examined the stones and stated that they were "Urim and Thummim as good as ever was upon the earth" but that they had been "consecrated to devils."

In 1842 Joseph Smith taught that the Nephites would use a Urim and Thummim during times of war to gain an advantage over the Lamanites.

In 1843, William Clayton wrote in his journal a theologically significant discussion he had with Smith that later became canonized as Section 130 of the Doctrine and Covenants

"The angels do not reside on a planet like this earth; But they reside in the presence of God, on a globe like a sea of glass and fire, where all things for their glory are manifest, past, present, and future, and are continually before the Lord. The place where God resides is a great Urim and Thummim. This earth, in its sanctified and immortal state, will be made like unto crystal and will be a Urim and Thummim to the inhabitants who dwell thereon, whereby all things pertaining to an inferior kingdom, or all kingdoms of a lower order, will be manifest to those who dwell on it; and this earth will be Christ’s. Then the white stone mentioned in Revelation 2:17, will become a Urim and Thummim to each individual who receives one, whereby things pertaining to a higher order of kingdoms will be made known; and a white stone is given to each of those who come into the celestial kingdom"

Apostle Orson Pratt taught that the biblical Noah had a Urim and Thummim, and used it to obtain direction for building the ark.

See also

 Book of Abraham
 Crystal gazing
 Cunning folk traditions and the Latter Day Saint movement
 List of references to seer stones in the Latter Day Saint movement history
 Reformed Egyptian
 Scrying

Notes

References
.

Joseph Smith
Book of Mormon artifacts
Objects used for divination
Latter Day Saint belief and doctrine
Latter Day Saint terms
Sacred rocks
Angel Moroni
Seership in Mormonism